The Moyie River Canyon Bridge is a structural steel truss cantilever bridge that spans the Moyie River in the city of Moyie Springs just east of Bonners Ferry, Idaho. Constructed in 1965, the bridge is on U.S. Route 2 at mile marker 70.

The only higher bridges in Idaho are the Dent Suspension Bridge (500' tall) and Perrine Bridge (486' tall).

See also

External links
National Bridge Inventory Database

Notes

Buildings and structures in Boundary County, Idaho
Bridges completed in 1965
Transportation in Boundary County, Idaho
Road bridges in Idaho
U.S. Route 2
Bridges of the United States Numbered Highway System
Steel bridges in the United States
Cantilever bridges in the United States